Florian Hardy (born February 8, 1985) is a French professional ice hockey goaltender who is currently playing with Les Ducs D’Angers of Ligue Magnus France. Hardy joined Dornbirner on June 24, 2015, after his first season in the DEL with EHC München.

International
Hardy was named to the France men's national ice hockey team for the 2010 IIHF World Championship. He was also selected for competition at the 2014 IIHF World Championship and the 2017 IIHF World Championship. Hardy was awarded Player of the Game award in a 5-1 victory against Finland at the 2017 IIHF World Championships. The award was originally awarded to Pierre-Édouard Bellemare, but Bellemare refused to accept the award and gave it to Hardy instead. Hardy saved 42 out of 43 shots in the 5-1 victory.

References

External links

1985 births
Living people
Chamonix HC players
Dornbirn Bulldogs players
Ducs d'Angers players
Ducs de Dijon players
French ice hockey goaltenders
EHC München players
HC Morzine-Avoriaz players
Sportspeople from Nantes